The 2003 Stanley Cup playoffs, the playoff tournament of the National Hockey League (NHL), began on April 9, 2003, following the 2002–03 regular season. The playoffs concluded on June 9, 2003, with the New Jersey Devils defeating the Mighty Ducks of Anaheim in seven games.

The 16 qualifying teams played best-of-seven series in the conference quarterfinals, semifinals, and finals. Each conference champion proceeded to the Stanley Cup Finals. These playoffs marked the first time the Minnesota Wild qualified, in only their third season in the NHL. The Minnesota Wild, a sixth-seed, made an unlikely advance to the Western Conference Final as underdogs after being down three games to one in two consecutive rounds. This, along with the Canucks' comeback against the Blues, made for three 3-1 series comebacks in the playoffs, the second time this had happened in NHL playoff history.

Despite losing to the Devils in the Stanley Cup Finals, Mighty Ducks goaltender Jean-Sebastien Giguere was awarded the Conn Smythe Trophy as the Most Valuable Player during the playoffs, marking only the fifth time that the Trophy had ever been awarded to a player on the losing team.

Playoff seeds

Eastern Conference
Ottawa Senators, Northeast Division champions, Eastern Conference regular season champions, Presidents' Trophy winners – 113 points 
New Jersey Devils, Atlantic Division champions – 108 points
Tampa Bay Lightning, Southeast Division champions – 93 points
Philadelphia Flyers – 107 points
Toronto Maple Leafs – 98 points
Washington Capitals – 92 points
Boston Bruins – 87 points
New York Islanders – 83 points

Western Conference
Dallas Stars, Pacific Division champions, Western Conference regular season champions – 111 points
Detroit Red Wings, Central Division champions – 110 points
Colorado Avalanche, Northwest Division champions – 105 points
Vancouver Canucks – 104 points
St. Louis Blues – 99 points
Minnesota Wild – 95 points (42 wins)
Mighty Ducks of Anaheim – 95 points (40 wins)
Edmonton Oilers – 92 points

Playoff bracket

Conference Quarterfinals

Eastern Conference Quarterfinals

(1) Ottawa Senators vs. (8) New York Islanders
The Ottawa Senators finished as the first overall seed in the Eastern Conference with 113 points. The New York Islanders earned 83 points during the regular season to finish eighth overall in the Eastern Conference. This was the first playoff series between these two teams. Ottawa won the four game regular season series by earning five of eight points in their matchup.

The Senators defeated the Islanders in five games. In game one, Roman Hamrlik assisted on two of the three goals and Islanders goalie Garth Snow shut out the Senators stopping all 25 shots he faced in a 3–0 victory. The Senators responded in game two by shutting out the Islanders 3–0; goalie Patrick Lalime stopped all 16 shots he faced. Overtime was required in game three with both teams tied at two at the end of the third period. At 2:25 of the second overtime, Todd White scored his second goal of the game to give the Senators a 3–2 victory. In game four, Marian Hossa had a goal and an assist to help the Senators take a 3–1 series lead in a 3–1 win. In game five, Todd White's goal at 11:05 of the second period proved to be the game-winner and series-winner for the Senators with Radek Bonk providing two insurance goals in a 4–1 victory.

(2) New Jersey Devils vs. (7) Boston Bruins
The New Jersey Devils entered the playoffs as the second seed in the Eastern Conference and won the Atlantic Division title with 108 points. The Boston Bruins finished seventh overall in the Eastern Conference with 87 points. This was the fourth playoff meeting between these two teams with New Jersey winning two of three previous series. They last met in the 1995 Eastern Conference Quarterfinals which New Jersey won in five games. New Jersey won this year's four game regular season series earning five of eight points.

The Devils defeated the Bruins in five games. In game one, Jamie Langenbrunner scored both New Jersey goals before Boston came within one goal in the third period. New Jersey hung on for a 2–1 win. Jamie Langenbrunner had a goal and two assists in game two to help the Devils achieve a 4–2 victory and a 2–0 series lead. In game three, goalie Martin Brodeur shut out the Bruins, stopping all 29 shots in a 3–0 victory. The Boston Bruins forced a fifth game on two goals by Dan McGillis as well as two assists provided by Mike Knuble and Brian Rolston in a 5–1 win. The Devils closed out the series in game five with Jamie Langenbrunner scoring twice and Martin Brodeur stopping all 28 shots he faced in a 3–0 win.

(3) Tampa Bay Lightning vs. (6) Washington Capitals
The Tampa Bay Lightning entered the playoffs for only the second time in their history as the third seed in the Eastern Conference and won the Southeast Division title with 93 points. The Washington Capitals finished sixth overall in the Eastern Conference with 92 points. This was the first playoff meeting between these two teams. Washington won three of the five games in this year's regular season series.

The Lightning came back from 2–0 down to defeat the Capitals in six games. Robert Lang provided two goals and Olaf Kolzig stopped all 28 shots to give the Capitals a 3–0 victory in game one. Game two saw Jaromir Jagr score two goals and two assists in a 6–3 win for Washington. The Lightning scored three times in game three; each time though Washington tied the score. Finally in overtime, Vincent Lecavalier scored a power-play goal to give Tampa Bay a 4–3 victory. With a chance to tie the series in game four, Martin St. Louis scored twice to help the Lightning earn a 3–1 victory. In game five, St. Louis contributed a goal and an assist to aid the Lightning in a 2–1 win and took a 3–2 series lead. The Capitals tried to avoid elimination in game six by sending the game into overtime, however, St. Louis' power-play goal at 4:03 of the third overtime ended Washington's season despite putting up 61 shots against goalie Nikolai Khabibulin. The Lightning won the game 2–1.

(4) Philadelphia Flyers vs. (5) Toronto Maple Leafs
The Philadelphia Flyers finished as the fourth seed in the Eastern Conference with 107 points. The Toronto Maple Leafs finished as the fifth seed in the Eastern Conference with 98 points. This was the fifth playoff meeting between these two teams with Philadelphia winning three of the previous four series. They last met in the 1999 Eastern Conference Quarterfinal, which Toronto won in six games. The teams split this year's four game regular season series.

The Flyers defeated the Maple Leafs in seven games. In game one, Alexander Mogilny scored a hat trick to give Toronto a 5–3 victory. The Flyers responded to the loss with a 4–1 win in game two with John LeClair, Mark Recchi, and Simon Gagne all contributing a goal and an assist. In game three, Toronto came back from an early two-goal deficit to win the game in double overtime on a goal by Tomas Kaberle, his second of the game. Game four showcased a triple overtime game in which Philadelphia nearly doubled the shots Toronto took. On the 75th shot for the Flyers, at 13:54 of the third overtime Mark Recchi scored his second goal of the game to help the Flyers take a 3–2 win. Sami Kapanen scored two power play goals in game five to assist the Flyers in a 4–1 win and took a 3–2 series lead. In game six, Ed Belfour helped Toronto force a seventh game with 35 saves in a double overtime 2–1 victory. The Flyers routed the Maple Leafs in game seven 6–1 with Mark Recchi scoring two goals and an assist and Justin Williams and Claude Lapointe both scoring a goal and two assists.

Western Conference Quarterfinals

(1) Dallas Stars vs. (8) Edmonton Oilers
The Dallas Stars finished first in the Western Conference with 111 points. The Edmonton Oilers finished as the eighth seed in the Western Conference with 92 points. This was the sixth playoff meeting within the last seven years and the eighth overall between these two teams; Dallas won five of the previous seven playoff series. They last met in the 2001 Western Conference Quarterfinals which Dallas won in six games. Dallas won three of the four games in this year's regular season series.

In game one, Edmonton scored two goals in the second period 3:48 apart to take the lead and then win the game 2–1. Dallas controlled game two by allowing only 13 shots on goal, and five different players scored in a 6–1 victory including Scott Young who had two goals and an assist. In game three, Edmonton scored three times within 3:05 to take a 3–2 lead early in the third period to win the game. Eric Brewer assisted on two of the goals. The Stars evened the series in game four by scoring 23 seconds apart in the third period taking a 3–1 victory as a result. In game five, Sergei Zubov scored two goals in a 5–2 win for the Stars. Although Edmonton tied the game in the second period after being down two goals, Mike Modano's goal at 13:08 of the third period proved to be the series-winner.

(2) Detroit Red Wings vs. (7) Mighty Ducks of Anaheim
The Detroit Red Wings finished as the second seed in the Western Conference, winning the Central Division with 110 points. The Mighty Ducks of Anaheim finished as the seventh seed with 95 points (losing the tiebreaker with Minnesota in total wins). This was the third playoff meeting between these two teams with Detroit winning both previous series via four-game sweeps. They last met in the 1999 Western Conference Quarterfinals which Detroit won in four games. Detroit won three of the four games in this year's regular season series.

For the first time in their history, Anaheim won a series in a four-game sweep. In game one, the score remained tied 1–1 through three periods of play. In the first overtime, Luc Robitaille appeared to score the game-winner with most Detroit players heading down the locker room when replay actually showed the puck hit the crossbar and post but stayed out. Finally in the third overtime, Paul Kariya scored at 3:18 to end the game; Jean-Sebastien Giguere made 63 saves in the 2–1 win for the Mighty Ducks. Rob Niedermayer had two assists in the Mighty Ducks' 3–2 victory in game two. Detroit almost tied the game in game three cutting the deficit to one goal late in the third period, however the Mighty Ducks would reign victorious in a 2–1 triumph with J.S. Giguere making 36 saves in the process. Anaheim ended Detroit's season in the first overtime of game four on Steve Rucchin's goal. The Red Wings became only the second defending Stanley Cup champions to be swept in four games the following year in a first round series, the other being the 1952 Toronto Maple Leafs.

(3) Colorado Avalanche vs. (6) Minnesota Wild
The Colorado Avalanche finished as the third seed in the Western Conference, winning the Northwest Division with 105 points. The Minnesota Wild finished as the sixth seed in the Western Conference with 95 points (winning the tiebreaker with Anaheim in total wins). This was the Wild's first playoff appearance since joining the League in 2000. This was also the first time since 1992 that an NHL team from Minnesota made the playoffs. This was the first playoff meeting between these two teams. Colorado won this year's four game regular season series earning six of eight points.

The Minnesota Wild came back from a 3–1 deficit to defeat the Colorado Avalanche in seven games. In game one, Minnesota scored three goals in the second period, two on the power play, to win the game 4–2. Colorado vanquished the Wild in game two with defenceman Rob Blake assisting twice in a 3–2 victory. Patrick Roy earned his 23rd and final playoff shutout in game three stopping all 18 shots he faced in a 3–0 win for the Avalanche. In game four, Minnesota Wild head coach Jacques Lemaire replaced goaltender Dwayne Roloson who had given up two goals, both to Joe Sakic, on four shots with Manny Fernandez. The switch did not help the Wild as they fell to the Avalanche in a 3–1 loss. Minnesota gained a 3–0 lead within the first two periods of game five before they had to withstand a comeback by the Avalanche in the third period notching the score within one goal. The Wild forced a sixth game with a 3–2 victory. Game six was a scoreless affair until the third period in which both teams each scored twice with Greg de Vries scoring the tying goal for the Avalanche with 1:32 left in the third period. In overtime, Richard Park scored his second goal of the game for the Wild to force a seventh game. In game seven, the Avalanche twice had one goal leads before the Wild tied the game a minute and a half later. Finally in overtime, Minnesota completed the comeback with Andrew Brunette's goal to send the Wild to the Conference Semifinals. This game was also Patrick Roy's last NHL game as he announced his retirement during the offseason.

(4) Vancouver Canucks vs. (5) St. Louis Blues
The Vancouver Canucks finished as the fourth seed in the Western Conference with 104 points. The St. Louis Blues finished as the fifth seed in the Western Conference with 99 points. This was the second playoff meeting between these two teams. Their only previous series was during the 1995 Western Conference Quarterfinals, which Vancouver won in seven games. Vancouver won this year's four game regular season series earning five of eight points.

The Vancouver Canucks became the first team in league history to come back from a 3–1 series deficit for the third time in team history, defeating St. Louis in seven games. In game one, goaltender Chris Osgood stopped all 20 shots and Alexander Khavanov scored twice for the Blues in a 6–0 win. Game two saw both Trent Klatt and Ed Jovanovski score power-play goals for the Canucks in a 2–1 victory. Doug Weight scored twice and added an assist for the Blues' 3–1 win in game three. In game four, Martin Rucinsky scored twice and recorded an assist for the Blues in their 4–1 win against the Canucks. Five players scored in the Canucks' 5–3 victory in game five. Markus Naslund helped the Canucks force a seventh game by scoring a goal and two assists in a 4–3 win in game six. The Canucks finished the comeback in game seven with help from goaltender Dan Cloutier, who made 33 saves and both Trevor Linden and Brendan Morrison scored a goal and an assist in a 4–1 victory.

Conference Semifinals

Eastern Conference Semifinals

(1) Ottawa Senators vs. (4) Philadelphia Flyers
This was the second consecutive playoff meeting and second overall between these two teams; Ottawa won in the previous year's Eastern Conference Quarterfinals in five games. The teams split this year's four game regular season series.

The Senators defeated the Flyers in six games. In game one, Ottawa came back from a two-goal deficit in the first period to win 4–2. The Flyers shutout the Senators in game two 2–0; goaltender Roman Cechmanek made 33 saves in the effort. In overtime of game three, Wade Redden scored to give the Senators a 3–2 win over the Flyers. Michal Handzus scored the only goal in the Flyers' 1–0 win in game four with Cechmanek stopping all 28 shots he faced. In game five, Marian Hossa had two assists in the Senators 5–2 victory. In game six, Ottawa limited the Flyers to just one goal while the Senators themselves laid five goals on Philadelphia each from different players. Ottawa won the game 5–1 and advanced to the Conference Finals for the first time in their history.

(2) New Jersey Devils vs. (3) Tampa Bay Lightning
This was the first playoff meeting between these two teams. The teams split this year's four-game regular season series.

The Devils defeated the Lightning in five games. In game one, Devils goaltender Martin Brodeur stopped all 15 shots he faced in a 3–0 win. Although the Lightning led twice in game two, the Devils were able to tie the score twice and in overtime Jamie Langenbrunner's goal at 2:09 gave New Jersey a 3–2 victory. In game three, Tampa Bay built a 3–0 lead in the first period until New Jersey tied it up in the second period. In the third period, Dave Andreychuk scored the game-winning goal for the Lightning; Tampa Bay won 4–3. Scott Gomez scored a goal and an assist for the Devils in their 3–1 victory over the Lightning in game four. After the teams each scored once in the first period of game five, neither team scored for four consecutive periods, including two overtime periods. Finally at 11:12 of the third overtime, Grant Marshall scored the series winner for the Devils in a 2–1 victory.

Western Conference Semifinals

(1) Dallas Stars vs. (7) Mighty Ducks of Anaheim
This was the first playoff meeting between these two teams. Dallas won three of the five games in this year's regular season series. Game one is the fourth longest playoff game in NHL history.

The Mighty Ducks defeated the Stars in six games. In game one, Anaheim gained a 3–1 lead midway through the second period, until Dallas tied the score with 2:47 left in the third period. After four scoreless overtime periods, Petr Sykora scored 48 seconds into the fifth overtime to give the Mighty Ducks a 4–3 victory. Sykora continued his point streak in game two, assisting on all three goals in a 3–2 overtime win for Anaheim. Jere Lehtinen scored twice for Dallas in game three, closing out a 2–1 win on Marty Turco's 31-save performance. In game four, J.S. Giguere stopped all 28 shots he faced and Mike Leclerc scored the only goal in a 1–0 affair for the Mighty Ducks. The Dallas Stars stayed alive in game five, forcing a sixth game with two goals from Niko Kapanen. In game six, the Mighty Ducks closed out the series and were able to move onto the Conference Finals on Sandis Ozolinsh's goal which gave Anaheim a 4–3 lead with 1:06 left in the third period.

(4) Vancouver Canucks vs. (6) Minnesota Wild
This was the first playoff meeting between these two teams. The teams split this year's five-game regular season series. Both teams had come off of 3–1 comebacks in the first round, and fittingly enough, the same thing happened in this series.

The Minnesota Wild became the first team in NHL history to come back from being down 3–1 twice in one playoff season to win both series in seven games. In game one, Markus Naslund and Trent Klatt each had a goal an assist in Vancouver's 4–3 victory. Minnesota tied the series in game two via Pascal Dupuis's two assists and Marian Gaborik's goal and assist. In game three, Markus Naslund assisted on two of Vancouver's goals. Brent Sopel scored the game-winner in overtime in game four as the Canucks took a 3–1 series lead. Minnesota began their comeback in game five outscoring Vancouver 7–2 with Cliff Ronning scoring two of those goals. Minnesota continued to outscore Vancouver into game six, with Ronning assisting thrice on the Wild's 5–1 effort. In game seven, Vancouver took a 2–0 lead midway through the second period, however, Minnesota's three goals in the third period sealed their fate. Minnesota won the game 4–2 and moved onto the Conference Finals for the first time in franchise history.

Conference Finals

Eastern Conference Final

(1) Ottawa Senators vs. (2) New Jersey Devils
This was the second playoff meeting between these two teams. Their only previous series was during the 1998 Eastern Conference Quarterfinals which Ottawa won in six games. Ottawa won three of the four games in this year's regular season series.

The Devils defeated the Senators in seven games after giving up a 3–1 series lead. After giving up a 2–0 lead in game one, the Senators won in overtime on Shaun Van Allen's goal giving Ottawa a 3–2 win. In game two, Jay Pandolfo scored a goal and an assist to help the Devils win 4–1. Game three was a low-scoring affair as Sergei Brylin had the only goal in the Devils' 1–0 victory; Martin Brodeur stopped all 24 shots he faced. New Jersey scored three times in the third period to take game four 5–2 and extend their home winning streak to eight games. Jason Spezza had a goal and an assist during game five in the Senators' 3–1 victory forcing a sixth game. In overtime of game six, both teams were deadlocked at one goal each until Chris Phillips scored the game-winner for the Senators becoming the fourth team this season to force a seventh game after facing a 3–1 series deficit. In game seven, Ottawa scored the first goal, but Jamie Langenbrunner, who did not score a goal in this series up until this game, scored twice in the second period. Ottawa tied it up early in the third period on Radek Bonk's goal. The game looked like it was going into overtime, until Jeff Friesen of the Devils gave New Jersey the lead with 2:14 left in the third period. New Jersey hung on for a 3–2 victory, moving onto the Stanley Cup Finals for the fourth time in franchise history, and avoiding the same fates as St. Louis, Colorado, and Vancouver.

Western Conference Final

(6) Minnesota Wild vs. (7) Mighty Ducks of Anaheim
This was the first playoff meeting between these two teams. This was the first Western Conference Final since 1994 to not feature either the Detroit Red Wings or Colorado Avalanche. This was the first Conference Finals appearance for both teams; the Mighty Ducks made the Conference Finals in their tenth season, while the Wild did so in their third season; the teams entered the NHL in 1993 and 2000, respectively. Anaheim won this year's four-game regular season series earning five of eight points.

Anaheim earned their second four-game sweep this playoffs season. Anaheim also only allowed one goal in the four games they played against Minnesota setting an NHL record for the fewest goals allowed by one team in a playoff series. In game one, Petr Sykora scored the only goal of the game in the second overtime period. Jean-Sebastien Giguere stopped all 39 shots he faced. Kurt Sauer and Rob Niedermayer both scored short-handed goals in game two as the Mighty Ducks shut out the Wild again, this time 2–0. Paul Kariya scored twice in game three, and J.S. Giguere shut out the Wild for the third time this series, stopping 35 shots, bringing his total consecutive shutout time to 213 minutes and 17 seconds. Determined to score, Minnesota got on the board for the first time since game seven of the Conference Semifinals when Andrew Brunette scored on a power-play. However, Anaheim followed up by scoring two power-play goals themselves, both by Adam Oates. The score remained 2–1 as the Mighty Ducks moved onto the Stanley Cup Finals for the first time in their history.

Stanley Cup Finals

This was the first playoff series between these two teams. Anaheim made their first Finals appearance in their tenth season since entering the league in 1993–94. New Jersey won both games during this year's two-game regular season series.

This was only the third time in NHL history and the first time since  that the home team won all the games in the Stanley Cup finals.

Player statistics
There was a tie for the playoff point lead between Jamie Langenbrunner and Scott Niedermayer, both of the New Jersey Devils and both with 18 points. Langenbrunner led the playoffs with 11 goals and Niedermayer led the playoffs with 16 assists. The 18 points to lead the playoffs was the lowest total since the 1968–69 season.

Skaters
GP = Games played; G = Goals; A = Assists; Pts = Points; +/– = Plus/minus; PIM = Penalty minutes

Goaltending
These are the top six goaltenders based on either goals against average or save percentage with at least four games played.

GP = Games played; W = Wins; L = Losses; SA = Shots against; GA = Goals against; GAA = Goals against average; TOI = Time On Ice (minutes:seconds); Sv% = Save percentage; SO = Shutouts

See also
 2002–03 NHL season
 2003 in sports
 List of NHL seasons

References

playoffs
Stanley Cup playoffs